Groban is a surname. Notable people bearing it include:

 Josh Groban (born 1981), American singer-songwriter
 Joshua Groban, associate justice of the California Supreme Court
 Lee (L.D.) Groban (fl. 1980s), American poet, artist, and reader of his own 87-hour poem in The Cure for Insomnia

See also 
Gruban (disambiguation)